Ekkapong Suratsawang (Thai เอกพงษ์ สุรัตน์สว่าง  ), is a Thai futsal striker, and currently a member of the Thailand national futsal team.

He competed for Thailand at the 2008 FIFA Futsal World Cup finals in Brazil.

References

Ekkapong Suratsawang
1986 births
Living people
Ekkapong Suratsawang
Ekkapong Suratsawang
Southeast Asian Games medalists in futsal
Competitors at the 2007 Southeast Asian Games